Immenhof  is a German television series.  The series featured a "pony ranch" from the Immenhof film series based on the novels by Ursula Bruns (born 1922).

See also
Immenhof films

External links
 

1994 German television series debuts
1995 German television series endings
Television series about horses
Live action television shows based on films
German-language television shows
ZDF original programming